This article shows all participating team squads at the 2009 Women's Pan-American Volleyball Cup, held from June 24 to July 5, 2009 in Miami, Florida.

Head Coach: Horacio Bastit

Head Coach: José Roberto Guimarães

Head Coach: Arnd Ludwig

Head Coach: Braulio Godínez

Head Coach: Marcos Kwiek

Head Coach: Julio Domínguez

Head Coach: Samuel Cibrián

Head Coach: Cheol Yong Kim

Head Coach: Carlos Cardona

Head Coach: Francisco Cruz Jiménez

Head Coach: Hugh McCutcheon

References
 NORCECA
 USA Volleyball

S
P